Kukhtinsky is a rural locality (a khutor) in Krasnyaynskoye Rural Settlement, Uryupinsky District, Volgograd Oblast, Russia. The population was 22 as of 2010. There are 2 streets.

Geography 
Kukhtinsky is located in steppe, 21 km east of Uryupinsk (the district's administrative centre) by road. Krasny is the nearest rural locality.

References 

Rural localities in Uryupinsky District